The 2009–10 SLC Super Provincial Twenty20 is the 3rd season of the official Twenty20 domestic cricket competition in Sri Lanka. Six teams in total, five representing four provinces of Sri Lanka and a Sri Lanka Cricket team participating in the competition. The competition began on 24 February 2010 when Ruhuna elevens played the Sri Lanka Cricket Combined XI at Dharmaraja College, Kandy.

This season comprised 15 regular matches, two semi finals and a grand final.

Teams

Stadiums

Rules and regulations 

Teams received 4 points for a win, 2 for a tie or no result, and 0 for a loss. At the end of the regular matches the teams ranked two and three play each other in the preliminary final. The winner of the preliminary final earns the right to play the first placed team in the final at the home venue of the first placed team. In the event of several teams finishing with the same number of points, standings are determined by most wins, then net run rate (NRR). All finals were played at Tyronne Fernando Stadium.

Standings and tournament progression

Standings 

Full table on cricinfo
(C) = Eventual Champion; (R) = Runner-up.
Winner qualify for the 2010 Champions League Twenty20.

Tournament progression

Fixtures

Round 1

Round 2

Round 3

Round 4

Round 5

Knockout stage

Semi Final 1

Semi Final 2

Final

Statistics

Awards 
 Man of the Tournament – Jeevantha Kulatunga: 277 runs (182 balls), highest score of 104* (62 balls) (Wayamba)
 Batsman of the Tournament – Dinesh Chandimal: 320 runs (202 balls), highest score of 75 (50 balls) (Ruhuna)
 Bowler of the Tournament – Janaka Gunaratne: 12 wickets (19 overs), best innings bowling of 4/21 (4 overs) (Basnahira South)

Most Runs 
The top five highest run scorers (total runs) in the season are included in this table.

Last Updated 11 March 2010.

Most Wickets 
The following table contains the five leading wicket-takers of the season.

Last Updated 11 March 2010.

Highest Team Totals 
The following table lists the six highest team scores during this season.

Last Updated 11 March 2010.

Highest Scores 
This table contains the top five highest scores of the season made by a batsman in a single innings.

Last Updated 11 March 2010.

Best Bowling Figures in an innings 
This table lists the top five players with the best bowling figures in an innings.

Last Updated 11 March 2010.

Media coverage

References

External links 
 Tournament Page – Cricinfo

Inter-Provincial Twenty20
Inter-Provincial Twenty20
2009 in Sri Lankan cricket
2010 in Sri Lankan cricket